A cutler is a maker of cutlery.

Cutler may also refer to:

People
 Cutler (surname)
 Cutler J. Cleveland, scientist

Geography

U.K.
Cutlers Ait, island in the River Thames
Cutler Heights, district of Bradford, West Yorkshire, England
Cutlers Green, hamlet in Essex, England
Cutlers Green Halt railway station

U.S.A.
Cutler, California, a town
Cutler-Orosi Joint Unified School District
Cutler, Florida, now part of the Village of Palmetto Bay
Cutler Bay, Florida, formerly known as Cutler Ridge
Cutler, Illinois
Cutler, Indiana
Cutler Township, Franklin County, Kansas
Cutler, Maine, a town
Cutler Regional Airport
VLF Transmitter Cutler, a transmission site for the US Navy 
Cutler,  Minnesota,  an unincorporated community
Cutler, Ohio, an unincorporated community
Cutler, Wisconsin, a town
Cutler (community), Wisconsin, an unincorporated community
Cutler and Porter Block, historic city block in Springfield, Massachusetts
Cutler Botanic Garden, in Binghamton, New York
Cutler Burial Mound, Charles Deering Estate, Palmetto Bay, Florida
Cutler Fossil Site, Charles Deering Estate, Palmetto Bay, Florida
Cutler Park, in Needham, Massachusetts
Cutler Park (Visalia, California), municipal park
The Cutler River (New Hampshire), on Mount Washington
Cutler Majestic Theatre, an opera house, Boston, Massachusetts
Cutler Memorial Library, an historic library in Farmington, Maine
Cutler Reservoir, in Utah
Cutler School (New York), college preparatory school
Cutler's Park, short-lived Mormon settlement in what is now Nebraska
Cutler–Donahoe Bridge, Madison County, Iowa
Carl C. Cutler Middle School, Mystic, Connecticut
Manasseh Cutler Hall, Ohio University
Old Cutler Road, in Miami-Dade County, Florida
Thomas R. Cutler Mansion, historic home in Lehi, Utah

Elsewhere
Cutler Stack, sea stack in the South Shetland Islands
Roden Cutler House, office building in Sydney, Australia
Cutlers Beach, Wonthaggi Heathlands, Bass Coast, Victoria

Music
 The Cutler, an electronica group

Companies
 Cutler Mail Chute Company, a mail chute manufacturer
 Cutler and Gross, luxury eyewear brand
 David Cutler Group, housebuilding company

Other
 Cutler Formation, a rock unit in the southwestern United States
 MV Lady Cutler, inner harbor ferry in Sydney, Australia
 Lord Cutler Beckett, an antagonist in the Pirates of the Caribbean film series

See also
 Company of Cutlers in Hallamshire
 Cutlers' Hall
 Master Cutler
 Cutler's bar notation
 Cutler's resin
 Master Cutler (train)
 Worshipful Company of Cutlers, London